Amanita kitamagotake or Becker's ringless amanita is a species of Amanita from Japan.

References

External links
 
 

kitamagotake